The Soccer Star of the Year is an annual association football award given to the player who is adjudged to have been the best performer of the season in Zimbabwean football. 

Typically 11 players are nominated as the Soccer Stars of the Year, this honour comes with a publication of a Calendar, sponsored by Castle Beer, in which the 11 appear. It is not a 'fantasy team' as such, and the 11 nominees could theoretically all be in the same position - though this of course is unlikely. From this XI, a Soccer Star of the Year is selected, with 2 Runners Up also being announced.

It was first presented at the end of the 1969 Rhodesian football season, when it was founded as the Rhodesian Soccer Star of the Year; the name changed in 1980. Each year's winner is chosen at the end of the season by a vote amongst football writers from around Zimbabwe. The 2010 winner was Charles Sibanda, who won the award while playing for Motor Action. He is the second Motor Action player to have received the award after 2006 winner Clemence Matawu.
Alexander R B was amazing in 2020
The first winner of the award was George Shaya, who played for Dynamos and won the award five times in all; in 1969, 1972 and three times in a row from 1975 to 1977. There are two other multiple-time winners: Peter Ndlovu of Highlanders won twice consecutively in 1990 and 1991, and Stanley Ndunduma won in 1981 and 1985, playing first for CAPS United and later for Black Rhinos. Malawian midfielder Joseph Kamwendo is the lone foreign player to have won the award, having done so in 2005 while playing for CAPS United.

Winners

Jay Jay

Notes and references
Notes

References

Sources

Zimbabwe
Awards established in 1969
Football in Zimbabwe
1969 establishments in Rhodesia
Zimbabwean awards
Annual events in Zimbabwe